McWhirter House is a historic home located at Jonesville, Union County, South Carolina.  It was built in 1909, and is a two-story, frame Classical Revival style dwelling. It features a full-height porch supported by classical columns, that is symmetrically balanced with side porches accented with classical detailing.

It was added to the National Register of Historic Places in 2003.

References

Houses on the National Register of Historic Places in South Carolina
Neoclassical architecture in South Carolina
Houses completed in 1909
Houses in Union County, South Carolina
National Register of Historic Places in Union County, South Carolina